Dealu Monastery is a 15th-century monastery in Dâmbovița County, Romania, located 6 km north of Târgoviște.

The church of the monastery is dedicated to Saint Nicholas.

Necropolis
Dealu Monastery narthex is considered one of the largest funerary spaces in the country, here being buried several voivodes, princes and clergymen. In chronological order, those buried at Dealu Monastery are:
 Vlad II Dracul (cca. 1390–1447), Prince of Wallachia
 Vladislav II (d. 1456), Prince of Wallachia 
 Radu IV cel Mare (1467–1508), Prince of Wallachia 
 Vlad V cel Tânăr (1488–1512), Prince of Wallachia 
 Radu VI Bădica (d. 1524), Prince of Wallachia
 Vlad VII Înecatul (d. 1532), Prince of Wallachia 
 Head of Mihai Viteazul (1558–1601), Prince of Wallachia
 Mihail Movilă (d. 1608), Prince of Moldavia

References

Romanian Orthodox monasteries of Wallachia
Historic monuments in Dâmbovița County
Christian monasteries established in the 15th century
Burial sites of the House of Dăneşti
Burial sites of the House of Drăculești